The Lucille Medwick Memorial Award is given once a year to a member of the Poetry Society of America. It was "established by Maury Medwick in memory of his wife, the poet and editor, for an original poem in any form on a humanitarian theme."

Each winner receives a $500 prize.

Winners
2021: Devon Walker-Figueroa, Judge: Amit Majmudar
2020: Melissa Studdard, Judge: Ruth Ellen Kocher
2019: Cecily Parks, Judge: Rosa Alcalá Finalists: Michael Dumanis, M. Soledad Caballero
2018: Molly Spencer, Judge: Maggie Smith Finalists: Benjamin Paloff, Kevin Prufer
2017: Hadara Bar-Nadav, Judge: Francisco Aragón
2016: Kaveh Akbar, Judge: Yona Harvey
2015: Sandra Meek, Judge: Fady Joudah Finalists: Adam O. Davis, Sara Henning
2014: David Welch, Judge: Jericho Brown Finalists: Janet McAdams, G.C. Waldrop
2013: Gary Young, Judge: Patricia Smith Finalists: Bruce Bond, Diana Khoi Nguyen
2012: Suji Kwock Kim, Judge: Ilya Kaminsky, Finalist: Rebecca Morgan Frank
2011:  Kerri Webster, Judge: Nikky Finney
2010: Sandra Stone, Judge: Juan Felipe Herrera
2009: Wayne Miller, Judge: Elizabeth Alexander
2008: Christina Pugh, Judge: Timothy Donnelly
2007: Wayne Miller, Judge: Tracy K. Smith
2006: Lynn Knight, Judge: Grace Schulman 
2005: Wayne Miller, Judge: Vijay Seshadri
2004: Wayne Miller, Judge: Terrance Hayes
2003: Alan Michael Parker, Judge: Katha Pollitt
2002: Minne Bruce Pratt, Judge: Cornelius Eady
2001: Mary Jane Nealon

Notes

See also
 Poetry Society of America
 List of American literary awards
 List of poetry awards
 List of years in poetry

External links
 Poetry Society of America main awards Web page
Gary Young

American poetry awards
Awards established in 2001